Thomas Daniel Hayes (25 October 1921 – 8 May 2010) was an Australian rules footballer who played with North Melbourne in the Victorian Football League (VFL).

Notes

External links 

1921 births
2010 deaths
Australian rules footballers from Victoria (Australia)
North Melbourne Football Club players